Ingrid Persaud is a Trinidad and Tobago-born writer, artist, and academic, who lives in the United Kingdom. She won the BBC National Short Story Award in 2018, and the Commonwealth Short Story Prize in 2017, with her debut effort The Sweet Sop. The story is about an estranged father and son reunited through their shared love for chocolate.

In 2020, Persaud's novel Love After Love, was published by Faber in the UK and One World, Random House in the USA. Love After Love won the Costa First Novel Award in 2020. She has written for the magazines Granta, Prospect and Pree, as well as for The Guardian and the I newspapers.

Writing career

Persaud began writing in her 40s, after a successful career as a legal academic and visual artist.

Persaud read law at the London School of Economics, and studied fine art at Goldsmith College and Central St. Martins. She taught law at King's College, London and The Fletcher School of Law and Diplomacy and worked as a visual artist before becoming a writer. She has also written for National Geographic.

Love After Love 
The story set in modern day Trinidad centres the Ramdin-Chetan family, told from three separate perspectives: Betty Ramdin, her son Solo, and their lodger Mr Chetan.  These characters form an unconventional household full of love and affection until the night when a glass of rum, a heart to heart and a terrible truth explodes the family unit, driving them apart. The novel asks us to consider what happens at the very brink of human forgiveness, and offers hope to anyone who has loved and lost and has yet to find their way back.

The book examines love in many iterations and also highlights the treatment of gay people in the Caribbean, the fragility of life as an undocumented migrant in the United States, as well as traditional religious beliefs contrasted with unconventional spirituality.

Persaud's debut novel received critical acclaim including from The Guardian's reviewer, who said, "Persaud gives us a captivating interrogation of love in all its forms, how it heals and how it harms, the twists and torments of obsession (mania), sex and romance (eros), family (storge), friendship (philia), acceptance or rejection by the community, and so on." The New York Times stated, "Great books about love, like this one, feel like precious and impossible gifts. We should cherish the writers who provide them."

The title is of the novel refers to a poem by Caribbean author and poet Derek Walcott.

Education and Work

Persaud read law at the London School of Economics, and studied fine art at Goldsmith College and Central St. Martins. Persaud taught law at King's College, London and worked as a visual artist and project manager before becoming a writer.

Personal life 
Persaud left Trinidad at 18 and moved to the UK to study. She has lived at various times in Boston and Barbados. She has identical twin sons.

References

21st-century women writers
21st-century novelists
Trinidad and Tobago women writers
Living people
Year of birth missing (living people)
Academics of King's College London
Alumni of the London School of Economics
Alumni of Goldsmiths, University of London
Alumni of Central Saint Martins